Marshall County Airport may refer to:

 Marshall County Airport (Illinois) in Lacon, Illinois, United States (FAA: C75)
 Marshall County Airport (West Virginia) in Moundsville, West Virginia, United States (FAA: MPG)
 Holly Springs-Marshall County Airport in Holly Springs, Mississippi, United States (FAA: M41)